Juan-Carlos Alonso (born 8 March 1958) is a Spanish former professional racing cyclist. He rode in one edition of the Tour de France, one edition of the Giro d'Italia and four editions of the Vuelta a España.

References

External links
 

1958 births
Living people
People from Durango, Biscay
Spanish male cyclists
Sportspeople from Biscay
Cyclists from the Basque Country (autonomous community)